Subbu Arumugam (12 July 1928 – 10 October 2022) was an Indian musician, writer and Villupattu theatre art exponent. In 2021, he was awarded India's fourth-highest civilian award the Padma Shri in the Arts and Literature category. He published 15 books containing Villu Pattu narratives, songs, short stories and novels such as Veera Pandia Kattabomman. Some of his published notable works are Noolaga Villisai, Ramayanam, and Villisai Mahabharatham.

Arumugam was born on 12 July 1928 at Chatthiram Pudukulam village of Tirunelveli district in Tamil Nadu, India. He received training in the Villu Paatu theatre art under A. Subbaiah Pillai, N. Krishna Pillai, and N. S. Krishnan. Arumugam had many Villu Pattu audio cassettes, videos, and devotional songs to his credit. Some of the other notable works include Kannile Nalla Gunam, a video on diabetic retinopathy, which was produced by Sankara Nethralaya, Chennai, and Sattam, Sathyam, Samudhyam, a video on legal matters, was produced by the Government of Tamil Nadu. He has also written comedy tracks, dialogues and lyrics for various films in India.

Arumugam performed Villu Paatu professionally for about 40 years from the 1930s up to the 1950s in various temples, schools, colleges, factories, corporate offices and media broadcasts.

Arumugam was awarded the Kalaimamani title in 1975 by the Tamil Nadu Eyal Isai Nataka Manramfor for excellence in the field of art and literature. Subbu Arumugam was honored with the Sangeet Natak Akademi Award for his contribution to the practice of Villu Paatu.

Awards and recognition 
 Padma Shri by the Government of India, 2021
 Sangeet Natak Akademi Award by the Sangeet Natak Akademi
 Kalaimamani Award by the Tamil Nadu Eyal Isai Nataka Manram, 1975

References 

1928 births
2022 deaths
Hindustani instrumentalists
Musicians from Tamil Nadu
Tamil musicians
People from Tirunelveli
Recipients of the Padma Shri in arts
20th-century Indian musicians
20th-century Indian writers
20th-century Indian male musicians
20th-century Indian male writers
21st-century Indian musicians
21st-century Indian writers
21st-century Indian male musicians
21st-century Indian male writers
Writers from Tamil Nadu
Tamil writers